Cape Verde, My Love is a 2007 Franco–Cape Verdean drama film directed by Ana Lúcia Ramos Lisboa. The film stars Neusa Cardoso and Eric Bridges Twahirwa in lead role along with Olivia García, Isabel Fontes and Cleophas Kabasita in supportive roles.

The film received critical acclaim.

Cast
 Neusa Cardoso as Bela
 Olivia García as Laura
 Isabel Fontes as Flavia
 Carla da Silvia as Natalia
 Antonio Teixeira as Chico
 Abel Monteiro as Valdomar
 Eric Bridges Twahirwa
 Cleophas Kabasita 
 Davis Kagenza

References

External links
 

2007 films
2007 short films
Cape Verdean drama films
2000s Portuguese-language films
French drama films
Portuguese drama films
2000s French films